This article shows statistics of individual players for the Cibalia football club. It also lists all matches that Cibalia played in the 2012–13 season.

First-team squad

Competitions

Overall

Prva HNL

Classification

Results summary

Results by round

Matches

Prva HNL

Croatian Cup

Sources: Prva-HNL.hr

Player seasonal records
Competitive matches only. Updated to games played 8 December 2012.

Top scorers

Source: Competitive matches

References

2012-13
Croatian football clubs 2012–13 season